The Voice Is Rich is a 1959 Mercury Records recording by Buddy Rich as vocalist backed by the Hal Mooney Orchestra.  The album has also been reissued on CD together (as a "two-fer") with Buddy Rich Just Sings.

Track listing 
LP Side A
"Down the Old Ox Road" – 2:21
"Born to Be Blue" – 3:56
"I've Heard That Song Before" – 2:45
"I Want a Little Girl" – 2:36
"I Can't Give You Anything But Love" – 3:02
LP Side B
"You've Changed" – 2:39
"Me And My Shadow" – 2:28
"(Ah, the Apple Trees) When the World Was Young" – 3:57
"It's Been a Long, Long Time" – 2:56
"I Don't Want To Walk Without You" – 2:55
"Back In Your Own Back Yard" – 2:45

Personnel
Buddy Rich – vocals
Hal Mooney Orchestra

References

Mercury MG 20461 (Mono)
Mercury SR 60144 (Stereo)
The Voice is Rich at [ allmusic.com]

Buddy Rich albums
Mercury Records albums
1959 albums